Fikile Eunice Khumalo is a South African politician who has been an African National Congress Member of Parliament (MP) since 2020, and previously from 2009 to 2014.

Parliamentary career

First term in parliament
Khumalo was elected to the National Assembly of South Africa in the 2009 parliamentary election from the ANC's KwaZulu-Natal list. In the Fourth Parliament (2009–2014), she was a member of the Committee On Private Members' Legislative Proposals And Special Petitions, the  Portfolio Committee On Trade and Industry and the Portfolio Committee on Social Development and was the constituency contact for the ANC's Nquthu constituency office. Prior to the 2014 elections, Khumalo was not included on the ANC's parliamentary lists. She was the 58th candidate on the ANC list for the KwaZulu-Natal Legislature. The ANC won only 52 seats in the provincial legislature, declining Khumalo a seat. She did not return to parliament.

Second term in parliament
In 2019 Khumalo stood for the National Assembly again as a candidate on the ANC's KwaZulu-Natal list. She was not elected to parliament at the election. The Deputy Minister of Mineral Resources and Energy, Bavelile Hlongwa, died in a car accident in September 2019. The ANC appointed Khumalo to take up Hlongwa's seat in parliament and she was sworn in as an MP on 23 June 2020. She now serves on the Portfolio Committee on Transport and the  Portfolio Committee on Public Works.

References

External links
Ms Fikile Eunice Khumalo at Parliament of South Africa

Living people
Year of birth missing (living people)
Place of birth missing (living people)
Zulu people
African National Congress politicians
Members of the National Assembly of South Africa
Women members of the National Assembly of South Africa